A sovereign wealth fund (SWF) is a fund owned by a state (or a political subdivision of a federal state) composed of financial assets such as stocks, bonds, property or other financial instruments. Sovereign wealth funds are entities that manage the national savings for the purposes of investment. The accumulated funds may have their origin in, or may represent, foreign currency deposits, gold, special drawing rights (SDRs) and International Monetary Fund (IMF) reserve position held by central banks and monetary authorities, along with other national assets such as pension investments, oil funds, or other industrial and financial holdings. These are assets of the sovereign nations which are typically held in domestic and different reserve currencies such as the dollar, euro and yen. The names attributed to the management entities may include central banks, official investment companies, sovereign oil funds, among others.

Some countries may have more than one SWF. Also, while the United States does not have a federal sovereign wealth fund, several of its states have their own SWFs.

References

 SWF Institute - Organization dedicated to analyzing Sovereign Wealth Funds and Public Pension Funds

Lists of countries by economic indicator